Hugh Edward Foulkes (13 April 1909 – 1981) was a Wales international footballer who played as a left back. He made his only senior international appearance in a 4–0 defeat to Ireland at Windsor Park, Belfast, on 5 December 1931. He played in the Football League for West Bromwich Albion and Darlington in the 1930s. He also played for Welsh club Llandudno and in the Southern League for Guildford City.

His great-grandson Edward Foulkes was named after him and is a professional darts player.

Notes

References

1909 births
1981 deaths
People from Llandudno
Sportspeople from Conwy County Borough
Welsh footballers
Wales international footballers
Association football fullbacks
Llandudno F.C. players
West Bromwich Albion F.C. players
Guildford City F.C. players
Darlington F.C. players
English Football League players
Southern Football League players
Date of death missing
Place of death missing